Stanley Bay may refer to:

Stanley Bay, Hong Kong
Stanley Bay, New Zealand
Stanley (neighborhood), Alexandria, Egypt